The crimson-collared grosbeak (Rhodothraupis celaeno) is a medium-size seed- and leaf-eating bird in the same family as the northern cardinal, Cardinalidae.

The crimson-collared grosbeak is primarily found in north-eastern Mexico from central Nuevo León and central Tamaulipas south to northern Veracruz; however, it occasionally strays into the Rio Grande Valley of southern Texas, mostly in winter.

Mature males have black plumage with a dull red (Sibley 2000) or pinkish red (Howell and Webb 1995) "collar" on the nape, shoulders, and belly (much like the crimson-collared tanager); the belly is mottled with black.  Mature females have a black head and breast like males but greenish upperparts and yellowish underparts.  Young birds are similar to females but have less black.  The beak is black, big and stubby, with the upper mandible jutting roughly perpendicular to the forehead.

The song is a warble, often slurred upward at the end. Calls are penetrating whistles starting with an "s" sound, slurred downward or one upward followed by one downward.

The crimson-collared grosbeak inhabits humid or semi-arid forest and second growth, from low to high levels, sometimes skulking on the ground. It occurs singly, in pairs, or in mixed-species flocks.

The nest is a bulky cup made of grass and twigs and placed in a bush. The female lays two or three pale blue-grey eggs with brown markings.

References

External links
Photograph of a male
 https://www.hbw.com/species/crimson-collared-grosbeak-caryothraustes-celaeno

crimson-collared grosbeak
crimson-collared grosbeak
Endemic birds of Northeastern Mexico
crimson-collared grosbeak
Birds of the Sierra Madre Oriental
Taxobox binomials not recognized by IUCN
Veracruz moist forests